This is a list of the present unpaid ceremonial offices of High Sheriffs in England and Wales and in Northern Ireland, along with the more localised but equivalent Sheriffdoms of 16 towns/cities.

Historically a High Sheriff was appointed by the Crown to each of the historic counties of England and Wales and those of Ireland. The Sheriffs Act 1887 sets out the appointments and qualifications of sheriffs in England and Wales. The shrievalties were subsequently redefined in terms of the new administrative counties established by the Local Government Act 1888 and Local Government (Ireland) Act 1898. These were abolished in England and Wales in 1974 by the Local Government Act 1972, with shrievalties since then being defined in terms of the new local government areas created by that Act. As the structure of local government has changed since the introduction of unitary authorities from the 1990s onwards, the shrievalties in England and Wales are now defined as groups of local authorities, or parts of them, in a similar fashion to the Lieutenancies.

The shrieval counties and shrievalties contrast with different words and meaning in Scotland where the office of Sheriff has remained a judicial office.  Sheriffs preside over sheriff courts with one Sheriff Principal for each of the six sheriffdoms in Scotland.

England

High Sheriff of Bedfordshire
High Sheriff of Berkshire
High Sheriff of Bristol
High Sheriff of Buckinghamshire
High Sheriff of Cambridgeshire
High Sheriff of Cheshire
High Sheriff of Cornwall
High Sheriff of Cumbria
High Sheriff of Derbyshire
High Sheriff of Devon
High Sheriff of Dorset
High Sheriff of Durham
High Sheriff of the East Riding of Yorkshire
High Sheriff of East Sussex
High Sheriff of Essex
High Sheriff of Gloucestershire
High Sheriff of Greater London
High Sheriff of Greater Manchester
High Sheriff of Hampshire
High Sheriff of Herefordshire
High Sheriff of Hertfordshire
High Sheriff of Humberside
High Sheriff of the Isle of Wight
High Sheriff of Kent
High Sheriff of Lancashire
High Sheriff of Leicestershire
High Sheriff of Lincolnshire
High Sheriff of Merseyside
High Sheriff of Norfolk
High Sheriff of Northamptonshire
High Sheriff of North Yorkshire
High Sheriff of Northumberland
High Sheriff of Nottinghamshire
High Sheriff of Oxfordshire
High Sheriff of Rutland
High Sheriff of Shropshire
High Sheriff of Somerset
High Sheriff of South Yorkshire
High Sheriff of Staffordshire
High Sheriff of Suffolk
High Sheriff of Surrey
High Sheriff of Tyne and Wear
High Sheriff of Warwickshire
High Sheriff of the West Midlands
High Sheriff of West Sussex
High Sheriff of West Yorkshire
High Sheriff of Wiltshire
High Sheriff of Worcestershire
High Sheriff of Yorkshire

Town sheriffs
Town sheriffs are maintained in some of the historic counties corporate.

Sheriff of Berwick-upon-Tweed
Sheriff of Canterbury
Sheriff of Chester
Sheriff of Gloucester
Sheriff of Lichfield
Sheriff of Lincoln
Sheriffs of the City of London
Sheriff of Newcastle upon Tyne
Sheriff of Nottingham
Sheriff of Norwich
Sheriff of Oxford
Sheriff of Poole
Sheriff of Southampton
Sheriff of York

Wales
High Sheriff of Clwyd
High Sheriff of Dyfed
High Sheriff of Gwent
High Sheriff of Gwynedd
High Sheriff of Mid Glamorgan
High Sheriff of Powys
High Sheriff of South Glamorgan
High Sheriff of West Glamorgan

Town sheriffs
Sheriff of Carmarthen
Sheriff of Haverfordwest

Northern Ireland
High Sheriff of County Armagh
High Sheriff of County Antrim
High Sheriff of County Down
High Sheriff of County Fermanagh
High Sheriff of County Londonderry
High Sheriff of County Tyrone
High Sheriff of Belfast (City)
High Sheriff of Londonderry City

References

External links
The Association of High Sheriffs
The National Association of City and Town Sheriffs of England and Wales

Local government in the United Kingdom